Lethe sura, the lilacfork, is a species of nymphalid butterfly found along the eastern Himalayas from Sikkim in India to northern Burma. It is also found in Southeast Asia

References

sura
Butterflies of Indochina
Butterflies described in 1848